Avalanche Peak is the 20th highest peak in the Yukon territory of Canada.


See also

List of mountain peaks of North America
Mountain peaks of Canada

References

External links

NRC Geonames query

Four-thousanders of Yukon
Saint Elias Mountains
Kluane National Park and Reserve